Pavochon is a popular Puerto Rican food. It is popular during Thanksgiving season. Pavochon is turkey seasoned like a roasted pig and stuffed with mofongo.

The word is a portmanteau of pavo, meaning turkey, and lechón, meaning pig.

External links

Puerto Rican cuisine